The University of Nebraska Medical Center (UNMC) is a public academic health science center in Omaha, Nebraska. Founded in 1869 and chartered as a private medical college in 1881, UNMC became part of the University of Nebraska System in 1902. Rapidly expanding in the early 20th century, the university founded a hospital, dental college, pharmacy college, college of nursing, and college of medicine. It later added colleges of public health and allied health professions. One of Omaha's top employers, UNMC has an annual budget of $841.6 million for 2020 to 2021, and an economic impact of $4.8 billion.

History

A private medical college was founded in Omaha by the state legislature in 1869 and chartered in 1881 as the Omaha Medical College. It became part of the University of Nebraska system in 1902. A university hospital opened in 1917. In 1968, the University of Nebraska united its health sciences, forming the University of Nebraska Medical Center campus. In 1991, a technology transfer office was created, known as UNeMed. In 1997, the UNMC hospital merged with the nearby Bishop Clarkson Hospital to become what was later renamed Nebraska Medicine.

Ebola epidemic response
During the 2014 Ebola epidemic, the federal government tapped Nebraska as one of three units prepared to accept highly infectious patients in the United States. Today, UNMC/Nebraska Medicine has the largest operational biocontainment unit in the nation.

UNMC's academic, local, state, and federal partnerships have expanded with the initiation of the National Ebola Training and Education Center (NETEC). the Special Pathogens Research Network (SPRN) and the National Training, Simulation & Quarantine Center. These organizations and additional alliances are housed under the Global Center for Health Security.

In 2016, UNMC was awarded a $19.8 million grant from the Office of the Assistant Secretary of Preparedness and Response in the U.S. Department of Health & Human Services. The four-year federal grant — which has renewable options for an additional 21 years — enables UNMC to teach federal health care personnel procedures in treating highly infectious diseases.

The University of Nebraska Medical Center created the Global Center for Health Security in 2017. The goal of the creation of the center is to transform and centralize "infectious disease response and biodefense research." Among the reasons behind the move were concerns about outbreaks of viruses, infectious diseases, and an environment where a biological terrorist attack is a possibility.

In 2016, a UNMC team of researchers was awarded a five-year research grant from the National Institutes of Health totaling nearly $20 million, through the Institutional Development Award (IDeA) program and the NIH's National Institute of General Medical Studies. The grant will focus on developing early career researchers into independent scientists and increasing the infrastructure and other resources needed to support clinical/translational research (CTR) around the region. The grant will create the Great Plains IDeA-CTR Network, a collaboration involving nine institutions in four states: Nebraska, North Dakota, South Dakota and Kansas

SARS-CoV-2 epidemic response
In 2020, UNMC and Nebraska Medicine were enlisted to support a federal operation that evacuated 57 Americans from Wuhan, China, during an epidemic of novel coronavirus, SARS CoV-2. The group were placed in quarantine at Camp Ashland, a Nebraska National Guard facility near Omaha. Thirteen Americans were repatriated to University of Nebraska Medical Center on February 17, from the Diamond Princess off the coast of Japan. Ten had tested positive, and three others had been exposed. Three days later, eleven of these people tested positive.
UNMC scientists, working with evidence gathered in the National Quarantine Center, in the new $119 million Dr. Edwin G. & Dorothy Balbach Davis Global Center on UNMC's Omaha campus, found the SARS-CoV-2 virus spreads through airborne transmission.
UNMC led the first clinical trial in the U.S. on the use of remdesivir to treat patients hospitalized with COVID-19.
UNMC developed a series of guides to help meatpacking facilities, child development centers, court systems, K-12 education and higher education minimize the risk of COVID-19 and reduce
disruptions to business operations. UNMC scientists developed a safe and effective method to decontaminate N95 respirators using ultraviolet light. The process, shared with hospital systems across the U.S., allowed multiple reuse of N95s when personal protective equipment was in short supply.

Academics and rankings 
In 2022, UNMC's bachelor's in nursing program was ranked 15th of 681 nursing programs by U.S. News & World Report.  UNMC's primary care program was tied for 6th of 191 medical schools. Other programs that also received a national ranking include graduates practicing in rural health care (5th of 159); research (54th of 191); the College of Pharmacy (28th of 134); the College of Nursing Doctor of Nursing Practice program (40th of 330); the College of Public Health (56th of 177), and the College of Allied Health Professions' physical therapy program (34 of 239) and physician assistant program (15 of 170).

UNMC was named a Fulbright U.S. Scholar Program Top Producing Institution for the 2019–2020 and 2020-2021 academic years by the U.S. Department of State's Bureau of Educational and Cultural Affairs.

UNMC's commitment to research has resulted in the addition of the twin state-of-the-art Durham Research Towers and the Fred & Pamela Buffett Cancer Center, opened in June 2017. External funding for research, education and public service totaled $228.5 million in fiscal year 2021. Federal research grants totaled $163.9 million in 2020-21.

The Fred & Pamela Buffett Cancer Center, a $370 million project, the largest project ever at the University of Nebraska, opened in 2017. The Buffett Cancer Center is a joint project with UNMC's primary clinical partner, Nebraska Medicine. and includes three areas dedicated to cancer: the Suzanne and Walter Scott Research Tower, the C.L. Werner Cancer Hospital, and a multidisciplinary outpatient treatment clinic. It is one of 69 centers designated by the National Cancer Institute.

Colleges and institutes:
 College of Medicine
College of Dentistry – The dental college is located in Lincoln, Nebraska, on the East Campus of the University of Nebraska–Lincoln.
 College of Nursing
 College of Pharmacy
 College of Public Health
 College of Allied Health Professions
 Graduate studies program through the University of Nebraska Graduate College
 Eppley Institute for Cancer Research and Allied Diseases
 Munroe-Meyer Institute for Developmental Disabilities

Campus growth
Projects completed in recent years include:
 Dr. Edwin G. & Dorothy Balbach Davis Global Center. The $102 million facility houses UNMC's iEXCEL initiative, which includes advanced simulation clinical settings and virtual immersive reality technology.
 Munroe-Meyer Institute for Developmental Disabilities moved from UNMC's main campus to a building near 69th and Pine Streets after an $86 million renovation.
 Wigton Heritage Centeran, an $8 million, 10,000-square-foot welcome center that also memorializes UNMC's history, and the associated $18 million renovation of Wittson Hall.
 College of Nursing – Lincoln Division. The $41.5 million facility houses the UNMC College of Nursing's Lincoln Division and University of Nebraska-Lincoln University Health Center in a combined structure of about 100,000 square feet.
 The UNMC Center for Drug Discovery and Lozier Center for Pharmacy Sciences in 2016. The previous College of Pharmacy building was renamed the Joseph D. & Millie E. Williams Science Hall. 
 The Health Science Education Complex at the University of Nebraska at Kearney in 2015 The facility enabled UNMC to expand allied health programs for physician assistants, physical therapists, clinical laboratory scientists, radiographers and diagnostic medical sonographers. The building also allowed the UNMC College of Nursing to expand its master's programs for nurse practitioners and its bachelor's in nursing program on the Kearney campus. 
 The Center for Nursing Science in 2010 The  building has enabled the College of Nursing to enroll more nursing students, and prepare more nurse faculty.
 The Stanley M. Truhlsen Eye Institute, which opened in June 2013. The institute is the home of the UNMC Department of Ophthalmology.
 The Harold M. and Beverly Maurer Center for Public Health opened in 2011 to provide a home to the College of Public Health, added in 2007 to address a variety of issues facing Nebraska, including health promotion and disease prevention, environmental health and safety, health care delivery, and biosecurity and biopreparedness
 The J. Paul and Eleanor McIntosh College of Nursing in 2010, UNMC opened its newest nursing division and building in Norfolk, Nebraska, thanks to an $11.9 million capital campaign a partnership between Northeast Community College in Norfolk and the UNMC College of Nursing
 The Home Instead Center for Successful Aging in 2019 This two-level center increased clinical and translational research by establishing an appropriate environment for conducting clinical trials for Alzheimer's disease and other geriatric-specific disorders. 
 The Durham Research Center II in 2009, the $76.5 million twin to the original Durham Research Center tower, both of which were almost exclusively funded with private sources
 The Weigel Williamson Center for Visual Rehabilitation in 2008, the $1.2 million center provides visual rehabilitation for adults and children with low vision.
 A renovated Bennett Hall in 2008, which moved all allied health professions education under one roof. The former School of Allied Health Professions became a college in 2015.

Notable alumni
 Jim Armitage, world-renowned authority in lymphoma 
 Casey Beran, orthopedic surgeon who was inducted into the Nebraska Football Hall of Fame in 2018
 Gretchen and Warren Berggren, physicians known for service as public health advocates in 26 countries and as mentors to hundreds of people in public health
 Nancy Fahrenwald, dean of Texas A&M University College of Nursing 
 Stephen Gilson, theorist and policy analyst known for work in disability, diversity, and health policy
 Jeremy Hosein, physician and former White House Fellow
 Bob Kerrey, former Nebraska governor, former U.S. senator from Nebraska, Medal of Honor recipient for service in the Vietnam War as a Navy Seal
 Guinter Khan, physician and creator of Minoxidil, a hair growth stimulant 
 Lynne Kirk, chief accreditation officer, Accreditation Council for Graduate Medical Education 
 James Linder, author, academic, business leader, and authority on university research commercialization
 Rod Markin, pioneer and leading authority in the field of laboratory automation who designed one of the world's first automated clinical laboratory specimen, device and analyzer management systems
 John Nwangwu, public health doctor with expertise in infectious diseases and epidemiology, and consultant at the World Health Organization
 Richard Allen Raymond, Under Secretary of Agriculture for Food Safety 2005–2009
 Steven M. Reppert, neuroscientist known for his contributions to the fields of chronobiology and neuroethology
 Matthew Ricketts, first African-American graduate of UNMC College of Medicine and first African-American member of the Nebraska Legislature
 Edward Rosenbaum, author of The Doctor, an autobiographical chronicle of his experience with throat cancer, which was the basis of the movie The Doctor, starring William Hurt as a physician modeled on Rosenbaum
 Nancy Snyderman, physician, author, and former broadcast journalist who served as a medical correspondent for ABC News and as chief medical editor for NBC News
 Michael Sorrell, authority on liver disease and gastroenterology 
 Carol Swarts, physician and radiation oncologist known for medical outreach throughout the world
 Cathy Todero, dean of Creighton University School of Nursing
 Francis Townsend, physician best known for his revolving old-age pension proposal during the Great Depression, which influenced the establishment of the Roosevelt administration's Social Security system
 Charles Vacanti, researcher in tissue engineering and stem cells
 Joseph D. Williams, pharmacist who served as chairman and chief executive of Warner-Lambert Pharmaceuticals
 Gail Walling Yanney, physician active in Omaha community engagement and development
 Rob Zatechka, former football offensive lineman in the National Football League who went to medical school after his NFL career ended

See also
 Eppley Institute for Research in Cancer and Allied Diseases

References

External links

 

 
Education in Omaha, Nebraska
University of Nebraska Medical Center
Nebraska Medical Center, University of
Nebraska Medical Center, University of
Midtown Omaha, Nebraska
Buildings and structures in Omaha, Nebraska
Medical schools in Nebraska
Healthcare in Nebraska
Medical Center